Spirobolidae is a family of millipedes in the order Spirobolida.  The family consists of several genera with numerous species, and is commonly divided into the subfamilies Spirobolinae and Tylobolinae.

Classification
 Subfamily Spirobolinae
 Auxobolus Chamberlin, 1949
 Aztecolus Chamberlin, 1943
 Chicobolus Chamberlin, 1947
 Narceus Rafinesque, 1820
 Spirobolus Brandt, 1833
Subfamily Tylobolinae
 Hiltonius Chamberlin, 1918
 Tylobolus Cook, 1904

References

External links
 Photos

Spirobolida
Millipede families